Kimberley Ravaillion (born 26 July 1993), is an Australia netball international. Ravaillion was a member of the Australia teams that won the gold medals at the 2014 Commonwealth Games and the 2015 Netball World Cup and the silver medal at the 2018 Commonwealth Games. In January 2013, aged 19, she made her senior debut for Australia during an away series against England. This saw Ravaillion make her senior test debut before making her top-level league debut. Her first game for Queensland Firebirds came two months later. She was subsequently a member of the Firebirds teams that won the 2015 and 2016 ANZ Championships. Between 2017 and 2019 she played for Collingwood Magpies in Suncorp Super Netball. After missing the 2020 season due to pregnancy, Ravaillion rejoined Queensland Firebirds for the 2021 season.

Early life, education and family
Ravaillion is originally from the western suburbs of Sydney, growing up in Fairfield. She is the daughter of Seena and Warren Ravaillion. She has a twin sister, Jess, and an older brother, Chris. She attended Yennora Public School and Chester Hill High School before switching to Westfields Sports High School for year 10-12 (2009–11) to become part of their netball program. Between 2007 and 2010 she also attended the Western Sydney Academy of Sport.
Ravaillion is in a relationship with Adam Treloar, the Australian rules footballer. On 23 March 2020 she gave birth to the couple's first child, Georgie Olive Treloar.

Playing career

Early years
In her youth, Ravaillion played for Yennora and Canley Heights Hot Shots in the Fairfield City District Netball Association.

New South Wales
In 2011 and 2012, Ravaillion represented New South Wales at under-19 and under-21 levels in the Australian National Netball Championships. In 2011 she was a winner with the under-19s. In 2012 she was a winner with the under-21s team and a runners up with the under-19s. She was also named the 2012 under-19 tournament MVP.

Australian Netball League
Between 2011 and 2012, Ravaillion played in the Australian Netball League. In 2011  she played for NNSW Blues and in 2012 she played for the Australian Institute of Sport.

Queensland Firebirds
2013–2016
Between 2013 and 2016, Ravaillion played for Queensland Firebirds in the ANZ Championship. Together with Abbey McCulloch and Gabi Simpson, she made her ANZ Championship and Firebirds debut in a Round 1 match against Southern Steel. Ravaillion played 15 matches for Firebirds during the 2013 season. She was a prominent member of the  Firebirds teams that won the 2015 and 2016 ANZ Championships. In both 2015 and 2016 she was named in the ANZ Championship All Star team. In 2016, following MVP performances in both the Australian Conference Final and Semi-Final, she was named ANZ Championship Finals Series MVP.

2021
In October 2020, after three seasons playing for Collingwood Magpies and missing the 2020 season due to pregnancy, it was announced that Ravaillion would be rejoining Queensland Firebirds for the 2021 season.

Collingwood Magpies
Between 2017 and 2019, Ravaillion played for Collingwood Magpies in Suncorp Super Netball. She was a member of the new team's very first squad. On 15 June 2019, during a Round 8 match against Sunshine Coast Lightning, Ravaillion made her 200th top level league appearance.

Magpies statistics

|- style="background-color: #eaeaea"
! scope="row" style="text-align:center" | 2017
|style="text-align:center;"|Magpies
| 0/0 || 157 || 0 || 1 || 363 || 8 || 7 || 159 || 41 || 15 
|- 
! scope="row" style="text-align:center" | 2018
|style="text-align:center;"|Magpies
| 0/0 || 137 || 0 || 12 || 210 || 6 || 14 || 88 || 39 || 13
|- style="background-color: #eaeaea"
! scope="row" style="text-align:center" | 2019
|style="text-align:center;"|Magpies
| 0/0 || 98 || 0 || 29 || 184 || 7 || 17 || 141 || 36 || 15
|- class="sortbottom"
! colspan=2| Career
! 0/0
! 392
! 0
! 42
! 757
! 21
! 38
! 388
! 116
! 43
|}

Controversy  
While playing for Magpies, Ravaillion began a relationship with Adam Treloar, who at the time was playing for Collingwood Football Club. After Ravaillion announced she would be rejoining Queensland Firebirds for the 2021 season, speculation began to grow about Treloar's future at Collingwood. Collingwood allegedly claimed Treloar wouldn't be able to cope if Ravaillion moved interstate. However, Ravaillion claimed that Collingwood were using her move as an excuse to offload Treloar because of his $800,000 a year contract. Treloar was subsequently traded to the Western Bulldogs for the 2021 AFL season.

Australia
In 2011 and 2012, Ravaillion represented Australia
at under-19, under-21 and Fast5 levels. In January 2013, aged 19, she made her senior debut during an away series against England. She replaced injured captain, Natalie von Bertouch. This saw Ravaillion make her senior test debut before making her top level league debut. Her first game for Queensland Firebirds came two months after her test debut. Ravaillion was subsequently a member of the Australia teams that won the gold medals at the 2014 Commonwealth Games and the 2015 Netball World Cup and the silver medal at the 2018 Commonwealth Games.

Honours

Australia
Netball World Cup
Winners: 2015
Commonwealth Games
Winners: 2014
Runners Up: 2018
Netball Quad Series 
Winners: 2016, 2017 (January/February), 2018 (September), 2018 (January)
Runners Up: 2017 (August/September)

Queensland Firebirds
ANZ Championship
Winners: 2015, 2016
Runners Up: 2013, 2014
New South Wales
Australian National Netball Championships
Winners: Under-19 (2011), Under-21 (2012)
Runners Up: Under-19 (2012)
Individual Awards

Notes

References

Living people
1993 births
Australia international netball players
Australian netball players
Netball players at the 2014 Commonwealth Games
Netball players at the 2018 Commonwealth Games
Commonwealth Games gold medallists for Australia
Netball New South Wales Blues players
Australian Institute of Sport netball players
Queensland Firebirds players
Collingwood Magpies Netball players
Commonwealth Games medallists in netball
Australian Netball League players
ANZ Championship players
Suncorp Super Netball players
People educated at Westfields Sports High School
Netball players from Sydney
2015 Netball World Cup players
Medallists at the 2014 Commonwealth Games
Medallists at the 2018 Commonwealth Games